Footlight Serenade is a 1942 musical comedy film directed by Gregory Ratoff, starring  Betty Grable, John Payne, and Victor Mature.

Plot
Tommy Lundy is an arrogant champion boxer who is hired by Broadway promoter Bruce McKay to star in a stage act, which will include singing, dancing, a comedian called Slap and a boxing exhibition. Tommy makes sure his girlfriend, singer Estelle Evans, gets the female lead in the role, but he falls in love with dancer Pat Lambert, who becomes Estelle's understudy.

Pat is engaged to Bill Smith, who ends up with a small part in the show. They get married but keep it a secret so as not to irk Tommy and cause him to quit the show. Estelle because jealous of Tommy's attentions to her and tips him off that Pat and Bill were seen checking into a hotel.

During the boxing portion of the stage act, Tommy begins punching Bill for real. In between blows, Bill explains that he and Pat are now husband and wife. Tommy accepts this graciously, then he and Bill both take turns smacking Slap instead.

Cast

 John Payne as William J. 'Bill' Smith
 Betty Grable as Pat Lambert
 Victor Mature as Tommy Lundy
 Jane Wyman as Flo La Verne
 James Gleason as Bruce McKay
 Phil Silvers as Slap
 Cobina Wright Jr. as Estelle Evans
 June Lang as June
 Frank Orth as Mike the stage doorman
 Mantan Moreland as Amos. Tommy's Dresser (as Manton Moreland)
 Irving Bacon as Stagehand
 Charles Tannen as Charlie, Stage manager
 George Dobbs as Frank, Dance director
 Ray Walker as Reporter
 Lillian Yarbo as Estelle's Maid (uncredited)

Soundtrack
Except with You (uncredited). Music by Ralph Rainger. Lyrics by Leo Robin. Sung by Cobina Wright
Are You Kiddin'? (uncredited). Music by Ralph Rainger. Lyrics by Leo Robin. Sung and danced by Betty Grable
I'm Still Crazy for You (uncredited). Music by Ralph Rainger. Lyrics by Leo Robin. Sung by Betty Grable and John Payne
Land on Your Feet (uncredited). Music by Ralph Rainger (instrumental only). Danced by Betty Grable and Hermes Pan
I Heard the Birdies Sing (uncredited). Music by Ralph Rainger. Lyrics by Leo Robin. Sung and danced by Betty Grable and chorus
I'll Be Marching to a Love Song (uncredited). Music by Ralph Rainger. Lyrics by Leo Robin. Sung and danced by Betty Grable, Victor Mature, John Payne, chorus
Living High (uncredited). Music by Ralph Rainger

References

External links
 
 
 

1942 films
1942 musical comedy films
1942 romantic comedy films
American musical comedy films
American romantic comedy films
American romantic musical films
Films directed by Gregory Ratoff
20th Century Fox films
1940s romantic musical films
American black-and-white films
1940s English-language films
1940s American films